Gilbert Meriel (born 11 November 1986) is a soccer player from Tahiti currently playing for A.S. Vénus and for the Tahiti national football team. He was part of the Tahitian squad at the 2013 FIFA Confederations Cup in Brazil.

Meriel started playing soccer at the age of nine on Tahitian club A.S. Vénus. Five years later, he went to France to join the youth academy at Angers SCO, where he stayed for three years. While in France, Meriel also played for US Jeanne d'Arc Carquefou competing in the lower leagues, before returning home at 18. Upon his return home Meriel, like many of his national team colleagues, was forced to get another job and become a semi-professional athlete. Metiel earned a bachelor in economy and administration, becoming an auditor for consulting group KPMG.

On the Confederations Cup, Meriel had his first cap as the starting goalkeeper for Tahiti's in the squad's final game against Uruguay in Recife.  While Tahiti lost 8-0, Meriel was applauded once he saved a penalty kick from the eventually sent-off Andres Scotti.

References

External links
 
 
 
 Facebook Account Gilbert Meriel

1986 births
Living people
French Polynesian footballers
Tahiti international footballers
2012 OFC Nations Cup players
2013 FIFA Confederations Cup players
Association football goalkeepers